Pierrepont Manor is a hamlet and census-designated place (CDP) in Jefferson County, New York, United States. Its population was 228 as of the 2010 census. Pierrepont Manor has a post office with ZIP code 13674, which opened on November 29, 1843. U.S. Route 11 and New York State Route 193 intersect in the community; it is also served by an exit on Interstate 81.

Geography

Demographics

References

Hamlets in Jefferson County, New York
Hamlets in New York (state)
Census-designated places in Jefferson County, New York
Census-designated places in New York (state)